The Conservative Party was a Bulgarian party which existed between 1879 and 1884. It was linked with the newspapers Vitosha, Balgarski Glas and Otechestvo.

The Conservative party formed the first two governments of Liberated Bulgaria, but it didn't receive a majority in the parliamentary elections held in 1879, triggering a motion of no confidence and snap elections in 1880, which they also lost. It supported the 1881 coup and the Proxy Regime of Alexander I Battenberg which suspended the Tarnovo Constitution after which it was fully discredited and fell apart.

As early as 1882 the group of Marko Balabanov joined the moderate wing of the Liberal Party led by Dragan Tsankov which later formed the Progressive Liberal Party. After the political crisis of 1886 and 1887 some party members such as Dimitar Grekov and Grigor Nachovich joined the People's Liberal Party of Stefan Stambolov. The other leaders of the Conservative Party, led by Konstantin Stoilov formed the People's Party in 1894  which also included members of the Eastern Rumelia People's Party.

Important members
 Marko Balabanov (1837-1921)
 Todor Burmov (1834-1906)
 Georgi Valkovich (1833-1892)
 Dimitar Grekov (1847-1901)
 Todor Ikonomov (1835-1892)
 Kliment Turnovski (1841-1901)
 Grigor Nachovich (1845-1920)
 Konstantin Stoilov (1853-1901)
 Ivan Hadzhienov (1843-1923)

Sources
 Ташев, Ташо. Министрите на България 1879-1999. София, АИ "Проф. Марин Дринов" / Изд. на МО, 1999.  / 
 D. Popov. "Партийната структура в България от 1879 до 1901 година"

Political parties established in 1879
Political parties disestablished in 1884
Defunct political parties in Bulgaria